Rădăuți (Radivtsi;  Radevits) is a town in Suceava County, north-eastern Romania. It is situated in the historical region of Bukovina. Rădăuți is the third largest urban settlement in the county, with a population of 23,822 inhabitants, according to the 2011 census. It was declared a municipality in 1995, along with two other cities in Suceava County: Fălticeni and Câmpulung Moldovenesc.

Administration and local politics

Town council 

The town's current local council has the following political composition, according to the results of the 2020 Romanian local elections:

Geography
The city is located in the depression with the same name, at  altitude. It is one of the oldest settlements in Moldavia, known since the 15th century. The towns of Siret, Solca, Milișăuți, and Vicovu de Sus are located relatively close to the city, in the Rădăuți urban area of influence.

Demographics 

Rădăuți reached its peak population in 1992, when more than 31,000 people were living within the city limits. As of 2016, the town of Rădăuți was the second most populated urban settlement in Suceava County, after the county capital, Suceava.

At the 2011 census, Rădăuți had a population of 23,822 inhabitants: 96.97% of inhabitants were ethnic Romanians, 0.89% Russians and Lipovans, 0.88% Roma, 0.54% Ukrainians and 0.23% Germans (Bukovina Germans). 83.4% were Romanian Orthodox, 9.1% Pentecostal, 3.1% Roman Catholic, 0.9% stated they belonged to another religion, 0.8% were Greek-Catholic and 0.7% each Baptist and Lipovan Orthodox.

History 

The mention of "Radomir's village" (as part of a review of boyar property in the area) in a 1392 document (uric) is generally believed to be the town's first mention, and indication of the origin of the name Rădăuți (other theories state that the settlement had its origins in earlier periods, and that the name is a Slavic-influenced derivative of the Latin word Rottacenum, as allegedly used by soldiers in the Roman garrison in Siret). The oldest mention of Rădăuți as such dates from 1413, in a document issued by Moldavian Prince Alexandru cel Bun.

By the middle of the 14th century, Rădăuți was already a flourishing settlement, the seat of a prominent Eastern Orthodox church during the times of Bogdan I (1359–1365), and subsequently a bishopric. Around the St. Nicholas church (Bogdana Monastery), archaeologists have uncovered a habitation layer preceding Bogdan's period of rule, one which could point to the existence of a local center prior to the foundation of Moldavia.

Awarded the privilege of organizing fairs, Rădăuți evolved due to its favorable location midway between the Carpathian Mountains and the tableland area (with traders from both regions establishing contact in the local market). The fairs at Rădăuți have been dated to the time of Stephen the Great (a document from 1481; however, since the mention includes details of Stephen's intervention in solving a commercial dispute, it is possible that the fairs were well established by then).

Rădăuți has a cathedral, built in 1402, with the tombs of several Moldavian princes. Rădăuți was also the seat of a Greek bishopric, moved to Chernivtsi in 1786.

Rădăuți was one of the largest cities of the Duchy of Bukovina during the period of Habsburg administration (1775–1918). During that time it saw a high level of German (especially Swabian) immigration, which would later form the basis for the Bukovina Germans in the whole region.

Jewish history of Rădăuți

A Jewish community was present before the Habsburg takeover, and is attested to have been overseen by a starost.

Many Jews fleeing the Kingdom of Galicia and Lodomeria (as well as other Habsburg areas) from intense persecution and anti-Semitism during the Middle Ages settled in Rădăuți. The community was allowed a degree of self-administration, and witnessed a period of prosperity and cultural effervescence during the 19th century.

The majority of Rădăuți's Jewish population was exterminated during the Holocaust. Persecutions became widespread around 1938, when Jews were harassed and attacked by authorities under the Octavian Goga government; they were confirmed by anti-Semitic legislation passed by the Ion Gigurtu cabinet, and, in late 1940, exceptionally violent following the establishment of the National Legionary State. In October 1941, all Jews present in Rădăuți (more than 10,000) were deported to concentration camps in Transnistria.

Bogdana Monastery
The Princely Church at Rădăuți contained the graves of Bogdan I and his son Lațcu, both Voivodes/Princes of Moldavia, as well as a later ruler, Roman I of Moldavia. Is the oldest monastery from Moldova and Bucovina (1365). Inside the monastery there are 14 tombs (like Bogdan I (1359–1365), Lațcu Voievod (1365–1373), Roman I (1391–1394), Ștefan I (1394–1399), Bogdan, the brother Alexandru cel Bun, Bogdan, son of Alexandru cel Bun and others.

Twin towns — Sister cities 

Rădăuți is twinned with:

Natives
 Avigdor Arikha - Israeli painter
 Emil Armin - American artist 
 Alexandru Bodnar - athlete
 Heinrich Gärtner - cinematographer
 Irina Lauric - sprint canoeist
 Iacov Putneanul - Metropolitan
 Saint Bishop Leontie of Rădăuți
 Benedict Menkes - Romanian biologist
 Dan Pagis - Israeli Hebrew poet and literature researcher
 Lothar Rădăceanu -  journalist, linguist, socialist, and communist politician
 Ștefan Rusu - Olympic champion in Greco-Roman wrestling
 Matei Vișniec - Romanian poet and playwright living in France

Gallery

References

External links

  Rădăuți Town Hall official site
  Rădăuți Online - Unofficial site
  Rădăuți Info - Unofficial site
  Eudoxiu Hurmuzachi National High School, Rădăuți
  The Cultural Authority of Rădăuți
  Bogdana Monastery official site
  Gazeta de Monitor - Local newspaper about Rădăuți
  Suceava County site - Rădăuți web page
  Photo Gallery - Old photos of Rădăuți

 
Cities in Romania
Bukovina-German people
Jewish communities in Romania
Duchy of Bukovina
Localities in Southern Bukovina
Capitals of former Romanian counties
Ținutul Suceava
Holocaust locations in Romania
Populated places in Suceava County
Polish communities in Romania